Kur is a Palestinian village in the Tulkarm Governorate in the eastern West Bank, located 19 kilometers South-east of Tulkarm.

Population
According to the Palestinian Central Bureau of Statistics, Kur had a population of approximately 325 inhabitants in mid-year 2006. 7.9% of the population of Kur were refugees in 1997.

Healthcare
The healthcare facilities for Kur are based in Kafr 'Abbush, where the facilities are designated as MOH level 2.

History 
Ceramics from the Byzantine era have been found here.

Ottoman era
Kur  was incorporated into the Ottoman Empire in 1517 with all of Palestine, and in 1596 it appeared in the  tax registers as being in the Nahiya of Bani Sa'b  of the Liwa of Nablus.  It had a population of 32 households and 6 bachelors, all Muslim. The villagers paid a fixed tax-rate of 33,3% on agricultural products, including  wheat, barley, summer crops, olive trees, occasional revenues, goats and/or beehives, a press for olive oil or grape syrup, and a customary tax on subjects in Nablus region; a total of 13,166  akçe.

In 1838,  Robinson noted  Kur as a village in the Beni Sa'ab district, west of Nablus.

In 1882, the PEF's Survey of Western Palestine described it as: "A stone village in a strong position on a ridge, with a steep slope to the east. It is of moderate size, well-built of stone, and supplied by  cisterns. Traces of an ancient road exist near it. It is the Kursi, or seat of a famous native family (Beit Jiyusi). It is, perhaps, worthy of notice that the name resembles the Corea of  Josephus, near which was a fortress called Alexandrium. About a mile north of Kur is Khurbet Iskander (Ruin of Alexander); the position, however, does not seem to agree with the account of Josephus."  They further noted: "A ruined watchtower, like the one described at  'Azzun, exists north-east of this place."

British Mandate era 
In the 1922 census of Palestine conducted by the British Mandate authorities, Kur had a population of 301, all Muslims,  decreasing by the  1931 census when Kur had a population of 280 Muslims, in 58 houses.

In  the  1945 statistics   Kur  had a population of 280 Muslims  and a land area of  8,514  dunams,  according to an official land and population survey. Of this, 253 dunams were plantations and irrigable land, 1,677 used for cereals, while 17 dunams were built-up (urban) land.

Jordanian era
After the 1948 Arab–Israeli War and the 1949 Armistice Agreements, Kur came  under Jordanian rule.

The Jordanian census of 1961 found 336 inhabitants in Kur.

Post-1967
Since the Six-Day War in 1967, Kur has been under Israeli occupation.

References

Bibliography

External links
 Throne villages, with Jayousi Palaces in Kur, RIWAQ
 Welcome To Kur
Kur, Welcome to Palestine
Survey of Western Palestine, Map 11:    IAA, Wikimedia commons

Villages in the West Bank
Tulkarm Governorate
Throne villages
Municipalities of the State of Palestine